Wicked Ways may refer to:

 "Wicked Ways", a 2013 song from Eminem's album The Marshall Mathers LP 2
 "Wicked Ways", a 1986 song from Patty Loveless' album Patty Loveless
 "Wicked Ways", a 1990 song from Deep Purple's album Slaves and Masters
 "Wicked Ways", a 1998 song from American alternative rock band Garbage's album Version 2.0
 "Wicked Ways", a 2011 song from Five Finger Death Punch's album American Capitalist
 "Wicked Ways", a 2022 song from Halestorm's album Back from the Dead

See also
Wicked Wayz, a 1996 album by Mr. Mike